Richard Bate (born 22 October 1938) is a British rower. He competed in the men's eight event at the 1960 Summer Olympics. He also rowed in two editions of the Boat Race, in 1960 and 1961.

References

External links
 

1938 births
Living people
British male rowers
Olympic rowers of Great Britain
Rowers at the 1960 Summer Olympics
Sportspeople from Kolkata